Holland Museum in Holland, Michigan is a local historical museum. Located in a landmark, neo-classical former Post Office building next to Centennial Park. The Holland Museum also operates two historic house museums: the Cappon House and the Settlers House museums. 

The Holland Museum features, on its main floor, permanent exhibits on Holland's history "From Settlement to City," reflecting Holland's diverse history and multi-ethnic population. Temporary and traveling exhibits are shown in the Wichers Gallery. The new Dutch Galleries, encompassing the second floor, feature 600 years of Dutch art and culture: 17th-19th-century paintings, fine furniture, delftware, silver and original Dutch costumes. The Archives and Research Library on the lower level houses the museum's collection of books, papers and photographs related to Holland's history.

The Cappon House and Settlers House, a few blocks to the west, tell the story of Holland's early settlers with the beautifully preserved and restored living environments of Holland's first mayor and a common worker's family.

References

External links
Official site

Dutch-American culture in Michigan
Buildings and structures in Holland, Michigan
Ethnic museums in Michigan
Museums in Ottawa County, Michigan
History museums in Michigan
European-American museums
1897 establishments in Michigan